Yakushin or Yakushyn is a Russian masculine surname, its feminine counterpart is Yakushina or Yakushyna. It may refer to
Dmytro Yakushyn (born 1978), Ukrainian ice hockey player
 Mikhail Yakushin (1910–1997), Russian football coach and player
Yaroslava Yakushina (born 1993), Russian boxer

Russian-language surnames